Parnaíba (U-17)  is a river monitor of the Brazilian Navy. She is currently one of the last monitors in service.

History 
She was built for the navy in Rio de Janeiro and commissioned on 9 March 1938. She participated in the Second World War and is, as of 2022, one of the world's oldest commissioned warship still in active service. She is assigned to the Mato Grosso Flotilla.

During the Second World War, the ship was assigned for service in the port of Salvador, Bahia, where she underwent light escort missions and coastal patrols against the threat of German submarines, mainly because of her extremely shallow draft which in theory would let any torpedo attack pass under her without any damage to the ship. Her escort missions were mainly in coastal waters because of her poor seaworthiness in open waters, which necessitated constant repairs on the ship.

Modernization
She underwent a modernisation program at the Ladario Riverine Naval Base between January 1998 and 6 May 1999, during which her original reciprocating engine was replaced with diesel engines to increase her range and endurance. One of her original engines was placed on display at the Sixth Naval District's Lieutenant Maximiano Memorial Hall. A helicopter platform has been fitted over the fantail, allowing her to operate the IH-6B Bell Jet Ranger III, replacing the Eurocopter AS350.

References

Notes

Bibliography

External links 
 Brazilian Navy: Parnaíba U-71 (in Portuguese)
 https://www.youtube.com/watch?v=6LlpWhH6nQ4

Monitors of the Brazilian Navy
1937 ships
Ships built in Brazil
World War II monitors
Naval ships of Brazil
Riverine warfare